Jason Duane Jones (born May 23, 1986) is a former American football defensive end. He was drafted by the Tennessee Titans in the second round of the 2008 NFL Draft and also played for the Seattle Seahawks, Detroit Lions, Miami Dolphins and New Orleans Saints. He played college football at Eastern Michigan.

Early years
Jones attended Southfield-Lathrup High School in Lathrup Village, Michigan and enjoyed an outstanding prep career as a football and basketball player. He was named first-team All-Oakland Athletic Association as a senior, recording 27 tackles, six sacks, four forced fumbles and seven interceptions, three of which were returned for touchdowns. He also caught 25 passes for 395 yards and eight touchdowns as a receiver. The Detroit News named him the 44th-best player on the Blue Chip list in the state of Michigan, as he also added All-Metro North honors. Jones is the younger brother of retired American Professional Basketball Player Brian LaWan Alexander. Also, Jones older brother, Michael, played football at Alabama State and other brother, Jamar, works at the White House as a Secret Service uniformed police officier.

College career
Jones  played college football for Eastern Michigan University.  As a senior (2007), Jones received third-team All-American and first-team All-Mid-American Conference honors. He played in all 12 games with 11 starts and finished fourth on the team with 70 tackles. He tied for seventh in the NCAA with a career-high 19.5 stops for losses. He added 10 quarterback pressures, a fumble recovery and a forced fumble while breaking up three passes and blocking a kick. Selected to play in the 2008 Senior Bowl All-Star Game and finished with three tackles, one sack for 14 yards and one forced fumble. Jones was named the recipient of the Harold E. Sponberg Award as the team's top down lineman scholar-athlete.

Professional career

Tennessee Titans
Jason Jones was drafted in the second round (54th overall) by the Tennessee Titans in the 2008 NFL Draft. He started against the Pittsburgh Steelers in week 16 of the 2008 season as a result of injuries to Albert Haynesworth and Kyle Vanden Bosch.  In thirteen games during the regular season, Jones totaled 31 tackles and 5 sacks. He was particularly impressive in his week 16 game against the Steelers when his 3.5 sacks, 5 tackles, and 3 forced fumbles made him a candidate for Defensive Player of the Week.  Jones got ejected from a Week 2 game versus the Houston Texans. Jones was placed on injured reserve on December 9, 2009 due to a shoulder injury.

Seattle Seahawks
On March 17, 2012, Jones signed a one-year deal with the Seattle Seahawks.

Detroit Lions
On March 13, 2013, Jones signed a three-year deal with the Detroit Lions.  On September 22, 2013 (Week 3 of the 2013 NFL Season), Jones suffered a season ending knee injury.

Miami Dolphins
Jones had signed a one-year deal with the Miami Dolphins on May 13, 2016. He was suspended for two games on November 21, 2016 for violating the NFL Policy and Program for Substances of Abuse. On January 6, 2017, Jones was released by the Dolphins.

New Orleans Saints
On August 12, 2017, Jones was signed by the New Orleans Saints. On August 29, 2017, he was released by the Saints.

Charity work
Jones is affiliated with the 501c3 Non-Profit Team Alexander Athletics Colorado Club Basketball Program. The organization is exclusively for charitable and educational purposes addressing its mission through programs and events. T.A.A. encourages a cross-cultural environment to stimulate conversation with the purpose of overcoming racial barriers, relations and networking to promote unity through athletics and sports.

References

External links
Eastern Michigan University Athletic Page
Tennessee Titans bio
Team Alexander Athletics 

1986 births
Living people
African-American players of American football
Players of American football from Detroit
American football defensive ends
American football defensive tackles
Eastern Michigan Eagles football players
Tennessee Titans players
Seattle Seahawks players
Detroit Lions players
Miami Dolphins players
New Orleans Saints players
21st-century African-American sportspeople
20th-century African-American people